The 2007 Hockey East Men's Ice Hockey Tournament was the 23rd Tournament in the history of the conference. It was played between March 8 and March 17, 2007. Quarterfinal games were played at home team campus sites, while the final four games were played at the TD Banknorth Garden in Boston, Massachusetts, the home venue of the NHL's Boston Bruins. By winning the tournament Boston College received the Hockey East's automatic bid to the 2007 NCAA Division I Men's Ice Hockey Tournament.

Format
The tournament featured three rounds of play. The teams that finish below eighth in the conference are not eligible for tournament play. In the first round, the first and eighth seeds, the second and seventh seeds, the third seed and sixth seeds, and the fourth seed and fifth seeds played a best-of-three with the winner advancing to the semifinals. In the semifinals, the highest and lowest seeds and second highest and second lowest seeds play a single-elimination game, with the winner advancing to the championship game. The tournament champion receives an automatic bid to the 2007 NCAA Division I Men's Ice Hockey Tournament.

Conference standings
Note: GP = Games played; W = Wins; L = Losses; T = Ties; PTS = Points; GF = Goals For; GA = Goals Against

Bracket

Note: * denotes overtime period(s)

Quarterfinals

(1) New Hampshire vs. (8) Providence

(2) Boston College vs. (7) Northeastern

(3) Boston University vs. (6) Vermont

(4) Massachusetts vs. (5) Maine

Semifinals

(1) New Hampshire vs. (4) Massachusetts

(2) Boston College vs. (3) Boston University

Championship

(1) New Hampshire vs. (2) Boston College

Tournament awards

All-Tournament Team
F Brock Bradford* (Boston College)
F Chris Capraro (Massachusetts)
F Benn Ferriero (Boston College)
D Brian Boyle (Boston College)
D Chris Murray (New Hampshire)
G Cory Schneider (Boston College)
* Tournament MVP(s)

References

External links
Hockey East Online

Hockey East Men's Ice Hockey Tournament
HE tournament
Hockey East Men's